Bukidnon Paglaum Party (BPP), or simply Bukidnon Paglaum, is a local political party in Bukidnon, Philippines. It was created and founded by Jose Ma. R. Zubiri, Jr., who also stands as the party's chairman.

On 2012, it forged an alliance with the Liberal Party for the local elections in the province. The party was conditionally approved by the Commission on Elections on November 2012.

Despite the similarity in names, Bukidnon Paglaum Party is not related to the older Negros Occidental Paglaum Party.

Notable members
 Juan Miguel Zubiri – Senator
 Jose Maria Zubiri, Jr. – Governor of Bukidnon
 Alex Calingasan – Vice-Governor of Bukidnon
 Jose Zubiri III – Third Legislative District of Bukidnon Representative

Elections participated
 2013 Bukidnon local elections
 2013 Valencia (Bukidnon) local elections

References

Local political parties in the Philippines
Political parties established in 2012
Politics of Bukidnon
Regionalist parties
Regionalist parties in the Philippines
2012 establishments in the Philippines